{{DISPLAYTITLE:C17H21N}}
The molecular formula C17H21N (molar mass: 239.36 g/mol, exact mass: 239.1674 u) may refer to:

 Benzphetamine
 NPDPA, also known as isopropylphenidine or isophenidine

Molecular formulas